Sebastian Wunderer (born 29 October 1993 in Kitzbühel) is an Austrian male curler.

At the national level, he is seven-time Austrian men's champion curler, five-time Austrian mixed champion, and a one-time Austrian mixed doubles champion curler.

Teams

Men's

Mixed

Mixed doubles

References

External links

 
 
 
 Video: 
 
 

Living people
1993 births
People from Kitzbühel
Austrian male curlers
Austrian curling champions
Sportspeople from Tyrol (state)